Iorwerth Evans Evans (23 May 1906 – 18 September 1985 (aged 79)) born in Trelewis, was a Welsh rugby union footballer who played in the 1930s. He  played at representative level for Wales, and at club level for Bedford Athletic RFC, Bedford RFC, and London Welsh RFC, as a Hooker, i.e. number 2, he died in Bedford.

International honours
Iorwerth Evans won caps for Wales in 1934 against Scotland, and Ireland.

References

External links
Statistics at scrum.com
Statistics at wru.co.uk

1906 births
1985 deaths
Bedford Blues players
London Welsh RFC players
Rugby union players from Merthyr Tydfil County Borough
Rugby union hookers
Wales international rugby union players
Welsh rugby union players
People educated at Lewis School, Pengam